Nicola Jane Browne (born  14 September 1983) is a New Zealand former cricketer who played as an all-rounder, batting right-handed and bowling right-arm medium. She appeared in 2 Test matches, 125 One Day Internationals and 54 Twenty20 Internationals for New Zealand between 2002 and 2014. She played domestic cricket for Northern Districts and Australian Capital Territory.

She played in the 2005 and 2009 Women's Cricket World Cups, and was player of the series in the 2010 ICC Women's World Twenty20 tournament. In 2007, Browne and Sarah Tsukigawa set the highest 7th wicket partnership in WODI history, 104*. She also set the record 6th wicket partnership in Women's World Cup history, 139*, with Sara McGlashan in 2009. In January 2015, Browne announced her retirement from all forms of cricket.

Browne was included in the 2007 Waikato Bay of Plenty Magic netball squad.

References

External links

1983 births
Living people
People from Matamata
New Zealand women cricketers
New Zealand women Test cricketers
New Zealand women One Day International cricketers
New Zealand women Twenty20 International cricketers
Northern Districts women cricketers
ACT Meteors cricketers
New Zealand netball players
Waikato Bay of Plenty Magic players
Cricketers from Waikato